

British NVC community MG11 (Festuca rubra - Agrostis stolonifera - Potentilla anserina grassland) is one of the mesotrophic grassland communities in the British National Vegetation Classification system. It is one of three types of mesotrophic grassland classified as grass-dominated inundation communities.

It is a quite localised community. There are three subcommunities.

Community composition

The following constant species are found in this community:
 Creeping Bent (Agrostis stolonifera)
 Red Fescue (Festuca rubra)
 Silverweed (Potentilla anserina)

No rare species are associated with this community.

Distribution

This community is found mainly in lowland river valleys in the Midlands and South West England, with concentrations also in salt marshes on Britain's west coast.

Subcommunities

There are three subcommunities:
 the Lolium perenne  subcommunity
 the Atriplex prostrata subcommunity
 the Honkenya peploides subcommunity

References

 Rodwell, J. S. (1992) British Plant Communities Volume 3 - Grasslands and montane communities  (hardback),  (paperback)

MG11